Luke Wright (born 14 January 1982) is a British poet, performer, publisher, curator and broadcaster.

Life and career
Raised in northeast Essex, Wright is an alumnus of the Colchester Sixth Form College. There he began writing and performing poetry at age 17 after seeing Martin Newell and John Cooper Clarke perform.

He formed the poetry collective, Aisle16, with Ross Sutherland in 2000. Aisle16 created three poetry/theatre shows uses video and projections: Powerpoint (2004), Poetry Boyband (2005) and Aisle16's Services To Poetry (2006). Services to Poetry was commissioned by Candida Lycett Green to commemorate the centenary of her father, John Betjeman's, birth; it was made into a film. Aisle16 have continued to develop new ensemble work via their London-based "literary cabaret" night, HOMEWORK. Wright has been involved in a number of these and in 2011, returned to the Edinburgh Fringe with Aisle16 members, Tim Clare and John Osborne, for Aisle16 R Kool.

In 2006, Wright began creating solo shows of his poetry. By 2015, he had created nine. He is the author of several books and pamphlets. Wright tours as a support act for John Cooper Clarke.

Wright curated the Poetry Arena at Latitude Festival from 2006 till 2015. In 2007 Wright also hosted and programmed "Luke Wright's Poetry Party" in The Meadows In Edinburgh over two days in August, it was the Fringe Festival's first dedicated poetry venue in its sixty-year history.

In 2009, Wright set-up Nasty Little Press, an independent publishing house focusing on poets better known for their live performance work.

Stage shows
 Powerpoint, 2004 (with Aisle16)
 Poetry Boyband, 2005 (with Aisle16)
 Poet Laureate, 2006
 Aisle16's Services to Poetry, 2007 (with Aisle16)
 Poet & Man, 2007
 A Poet's Work Is Never Done, 2008
 Who Writes This Crap?, 2008 (with Joel Stickley)
 The Petty Concerns of Luke Wright, 2009
 Luke Wright's Cynical Ballads, 2011
 Aisle16 R Kool, 2011 (with Aisle16)
 Your New Favourite Poet, 2012
 Essex Lion, 2013
 Stay-at-Home Dandy, 2015
 What I Learned From Johnny Bevan, 2015
The Toll, 2017
Frankie Vah, 2017
Luke Wright: Poet Laureate, 2018
The Remains of Logan Dankworth, 2019
The Ballad Seller, 2020
Touring Show 2022 - Come! Come On! Meet Me!, 2022

Publications

 Live From The Hellfire Club (with Aisle16) - 2005, Egg Box
 Who Writes This Crap? (with Joel Stickley) - 2007, Penguin (also a live show in 2008)
 High Performance - 2009, Nasty Little Press
 The Vile Ascent of Lucien Gore and What The People Did - 2011, Nasty Little Press
 Mondeo Man, 2013, Penned in the Margins
 What I Learned From Johnny Bevan, 2016, Penned in the Margins
 The Toll, 2017, Penned in the Margins
 Frankie Vah, 2018, Penned in the Margins
 After Engine Trouble, 2018, Rough Trade Books
 The Ballad Seller, 2020, Nasty Little Press
 The Remains of Logan Dankworth, 2020, Penned in the Margins
 The Feel-Good Movie of the Year, 2021, Penned in the Margins

References

External links
 

1982 births
Living people
Alumni of the University of East Anglia
English male poets
British republicans